Paul Armand Guinebault (born 15 April 1871) was a French painter.

References

1871 births
French painters
Year of death missing
Place of birth missing
Place of death missing